Neskaupstaður is a town located on the fjord Norðfjörður  on the eastern side of Iceland. It is part of the municipality of Fjarðabyggð and, as of 2016, it has a population of 1,481. Neskaupstaður is the third largest town in Eastern Region. The town was originally built on a farm called "Nes", settled by Egill Rauði ("the red").

The town was nicknamed "Little Moscow" in the 20th century due its strong socialist background.

History
Until 1949, the town was only accessible by boat. Then it was connected through a 626-meter long single-lane tunnel that passed through the Oddskard mountains called Oddskarðsgöng. Oddskarðsgöng was 632 meters above the sea level and was built between 1974-1977. Oddskarđsgöng is now closed. The town is now connected with a new 7.542-meter 2-lane tunnel called Norðfjarðargöng which was constructed between 2013-2017.

The building of an aluminum smelter and a new hydroelectric power-plant in East Iceland in 2003 reinvigorated the local economy.

Neskaupstaður joined Eskifjörður and Reyðarfjörður in 1998 to form the new municipality of Fjarðabyggð ("fjords-settlement").

Geography
The other villages composing the municipality are: Eskifjörður (1,043 inh.), Fáskrúðsfjörður (662 inh.), Mjóifjörður (35 inh.), Reyðarfjörður (1,102 inh.) and Stöðvarfjörður (203 inh.).

Climate

1974 avalanches

On December 20, 1974, avalanches came from the entire mountainside above the town, killing 12 people. Intense snowfall had been reported in the area over the previous few days.  Along with the snow came a strong wind that apparently loosened the snow that had fallen on the mountains.  According to some accounts, the first small-scale avalanche actually occurred on 19 December; however, due to low visibility, no-one noticed it. Since the time of the deadly avalanches, a number of protective barriers have been installed with the aim of avoiding future avalanches. Prior to the 1974 avalanche, in 1885 and 1894, two other avalanches had been recorded, with the former causing several deaths in two farms.

Economy
Síldarvinnslan h/f  operates one of the most advanced fish processing plants in Europe, it mainly produces fish for human consumption. The company and its partners operate in five locations in Iceland and in the USA and Greenland. The company along with partners employ about 220 workers, and the 2010 revenue was USD 128 million.

Tourism

The Museum House (Safnahúsið) located in the center of the town (Egilsbraut 2) houses an art gallery, a natural history museum and a maritime museum under one roof. The art gallery displays a number of paintings by Tryggvi Ólafsson - one of Iceland's most celebrated contemporary artists. The natural history museum hosts an interesting collection of Icelandic mammals, shellfish, birds, insect and stones. The maritime museum houses a number of finishing and boat related old equipment from Josafat Hinriksson family. A small replica of Josafat's workshop is also an interesting part of the museum. The Museum House is open between 1:00 pm and 5:00 pm during June 1 and August 31.

Nordfjardarnipais and the surrounding area became Iceland's first official national park in 1972. Nordfjardarnipais separates Nordfjordur from Mjoifjordur.

The town hosts a three-day metal, hardcore, punk, rock and indie music festival, Eistnaflug, in July. The festival started as a small one day metal festival in 2005 but has since grown significantly. According to a local estimate, approximately 2,000 people attended the festival in 2015. Most of the attendees put up tents at the end of the town.

Nearest airport is Egilsstaðir, about 74 km by road. The main carrier is Air Iceland with flights to Reykjavík.

Notable natives
Tryggvi Ólafsson one of Iceland's best known contemporary artists was born here in 1940. He studied art at the National College of Arts and Crafts in Reykjavik before going to the National Academy Art Academy in Copenhagen.

In popular culture

The 2002 Icelandic movie Hafið (The Sea) was filmed almost entirely in and around Neskaupstaður.

Twin towns
 Stavanger (Norway)
 Jyväskylä (Finland)

Photogallery

References

External links

 Neskaupstaður page on Fjarðabyggð municipal website
 Official website of the Fjarðabyggð community

Populated places in Eastern Region (Iceland)